Black Run is a  tributary of Paxton Creek in Dauphin County, Pennsylvania, in the United States.

Black Run begins in upper Susquehanna Township and joins Paxton Creek  from the Susquehanna at Harrisburg.

See also
List of rivers of Pennsylvania

References

Rivers of Pennsylvania
Tributaries of the Susquehanna River
Rivers of Dauphin County, Pennsylvania